Maria Helene Henriksson Akraka (born July 7, 1966) is a retired Swedish entrepreneur, television host and former athlete.

College career
Akraka competed as an athlete in both cross country and track & field as Iowa State. She finished her career a four-time All-American and a two-time Big Eight champion.

In 2010 she was inducted into the Iowa State Cyclones Hall of Fame.

International career
She competed in four European Championships, three World Championships, and the 1992 Olympic Games in both the 1,500 m and 800 m races.

Post-athletics career
Akraka worked previously as a host of betting company ATG's channel, Channel 75, where she interviewed Horse racing jockeys.  She also worked for TV4 covering horse racing.  In 2006, she started working for SVT, hosting extreme sports game show Megadrom and also covered various sports competitions such as the Olympics and DN Galan.

In 2009, she and her husband bought an estate with an equestrian training stable in 2009. She now spends much of her time training race horses.

Currently she serves as an advisory for sporting goods retailer, Intersport and the founder/CEO of Sportcore, a career agency for former professional athletes.

Personal bests

Personal life
Akraka is married to former triple jumper Tord Henriksson and they have two children.

She was born in London to a Swedish mother and a Nigerian father. The family moved to Sweden but her parents separated and her father moved back to Nigeria. She was raised by her mother in Rågsved outside Stockholm. Her father Smart Akraka is a former track and field athlete who competed in the 1960 Olympic Games in Rome. She has a twin brother, Michael.

References

External links 

1966 births
Living people
Athletes from London
Swedish people of Nigerian descent
Swedish female middle-distance runners
Athletes (track and field) at the 1992 Summer Olympics
Olympic athletes of Sweden
Swedish twins
Twin sportspeople